Beatrice Dorothy "Bee" Wilson (born 7 March 1974) is a British food writer, journalist and the author of seven books on food-related subjects as well as a campaigner for food education through the charity TastEd. She writes the 'Table Talk' column for The Wall Street Journal.

Early life and education

Bee Wilson has said that she 'learned how to cook sitting at the kitchen table, reading her mother's cookbooks, starting with The Penguin Cookery Book.
Wilson attended Trinity College, Cambridge as an undergraduate studying History, and it was from Cambridge University that she received her doctorate for a dissertation on early French utopian socialism.

She received a Master's degree in Political Science from the University of Pennsylvania while on a fellowship from the Thouron Award.

In 1997, while still a graduate student, she appeared as a contestant on the BBC cooking show Masterchef, reaching the semi-final stage.

Career

After a brief academic career as a research fellow in the History of Ideas at St John's College, Cambridge, Wilson began writing a series of books linking food with wider themes of health, psychology and history.

In 2005, she published her first book: The Hive: the Story of the Honeybee and Us published by John Murray. The Independent called it a 'sprightly hymn to the honeybee'. It examined the human relationship with honeybees and the way in which the beehive has been used as a metaphor for human models of work, love, politics and life.  It also included honey-based recipes.

Wilson's next book, in 2008, was Swindled: From Poison Sweets to Counterfeit Coffee - The Dark History of the Food Cheats. This was a history of food fraud from ancient times to the present day.

This was followed, in 2012, by Consider the Fork: A History of How We Cook and Eat. This was a history of kitchen technologies, from fire to ice, from pots and pans to knives; to the spork. It has been translated into Spanish, German, Italian, Korean and Portuguese. Wilson's publisher, Basic Books explains that'Technology in the kitchen does not just mean the Pacojets and sous-vide machines of the modern kitchen, but also the humbler tools of everyday cooking and eating: a wooden spoon and a skillet, chopsticks and forks'.

In 2016, Wilson's book First Bite: How We Learn to Eat was a change of direction. It was the first of Wilson's books to address the practical psychology of eating rather than the history of food. Its main thesis is that human food habits are learned, from childhood onwards, and that they can also be relearned or unlearned at any age. 'The wonderful secret of being an omnivore is that we can adjust our desires, even late in the game'.First Bite won the Special Commendation Award at the Andre Simon Food and Drink Awards and Food Book of the Year at the Fortnum & Mason Food and Drink Awards. That book was described in the Financial Times as being "about the pleasure of eating and how we can reconnect with this".

In 2020, her book The Way We Eat Now: Strategies for Eating in a World of Change won Food Book of the Year at the Fortnum and Mason Food and Drink Awards

In 2020, The Bookseller reported that Wilson was writing her first cookbook, The Secret of Cooking.

Alongside writing books, Wilson has also been a prolific journalist, mostly writing about food but sometimes covering other subjects such as film, biography, music and history. For five years from 1998, Wilson was the weekly food critic of the New Statesman magazine, where she wrote about subjects such as school meals, the history of food and ingredients such as vanilla, tinned tomatoes, melons and butter.

After that, Wilson wrote the "Kitchen Thinker" column in The Sunday Telegraphs "Stella" magazine for twelve years. For the column, she was named the Guild of Food Writers food journalist of the year in 2004, 2008 and 2009.

Wilson has written book reviews and other articles for The Guardian, The Sunday Times and The Times Literary Supplement. She has written  "Page Turner" blogs for The New Yorker on ideas about the recipe. She has contributed articles to the London Review of Books, on subjects such as film, biography, history and music as well as the history of the restaurant in London. Most recently, she has written a series of Long Reads for The Guardian on subjects ranging from clean eating to ultra-processed food to the history of the British curryhouse.

Wilson was the chair of the Oxford Symposium on Food and Cookery from 2015-2017.

In 2019, Wilson co-founded a U.K. food education charity, TastEd, which describes itself as working 'to give every child the opportunity to experience the joy of fresh vegetables and fruits'. TastEd (short for Taste Education) is part of the Sapere network of food education which is used in a number of countries including Finland, Sweden and France and which 'was created out of the conviction that taste education is good for health'.

In 2020, she was one of the judges of the Baillie Gifford Prize for Non-Fiction.

Personal life
Wilson is the daughter of the writer A. N. Wilson and the academic Katherine Duncan-Jones. Her sister is the classicist Emily Wilson. She was married to the Cambridge political scientist David Runciman but they are now divorced. They have three children together.

Reception

'Be brave. Drop the diet. Make peace. If any book can effect long-term weight loss, it should be this one', wrote Melanie Reid in The Times, reviewing First Bite. In The Observer, Rachel Cooke wrote 'Wilson is a brilliant researcher' and 'has unearthed science that makes sense of our most intimate and tender worlds.

Responding to The Hive in The Guardian critic Nicholas Lezard wrote that 'For a moment you may feel, as I did, that part of Wilson's research for this book involved turning into a bee for a few days...You pretty soon realise that there is no dull fact about bees, whether we regard them for themselves, or for the metaphorical uses to which they are put by social commentators.'

Writing in The Financial Times, Wendell Steavenson described Bee Wilson's 2019 book The Way We Eat Now as 'clear and vital reading...an authoritative and brilliantly compelling description of the economic, political and emotional issues around our food'.

According to The New Yorker writer Jane Kramer, "Bee Wilson describes herself as a food writer. That's half the story". In Kramer's opinion, writing about Consider the Fork, Wilson writes on food as it relates to history, ideas and human life. In The New York Times, Dawn Drzal described Wilson as "a congenial kitchen oracle".

Works

The Hive: The Story of the Honeybee and Us, John Murray, 2004
Swindled: From Poison Sweets to Counterfeit Coffee, John Murray and Princeton University Press, 2008
Sandwich: A Global History, Reaktion Books, 2010
Consider the Fork: A History of How We Cook and Eat, Basic Books, 2012 (history of kitchen technology, from fire to the AeroPress)
 Translated into Spanish as La importancia del tenedor. Historia, inventos y artilugios en la cocina, Turner, 2013
First Bite: How We Learn to Eat, Basic Books and Fourth Estate
 Translated into Spanish as El primer bocado. Cómo aprendemos a comer, Turner, 2016
This is Not a Diet Book: A User's Guide to Eating Well., Harper Collins, 2016
The Way We Eat Now. Strategies for eating in a world of change., Harper Collins, 2019
 Published in the US as The Way We Eat Now: How the Food Revolution Has Transformed Our Lives, Our Bodies, and Our World, Basic Books, 2019

References

External links
 
 "Consider the Fork" website
 Bee Wilson contributor page at The Guardian
 Bee Wilson contributor page at the New Statesman
 Bee Wilson contributor page at The Telegraph
  The Oxford Symposium

1974 births
Living people
English journalists
People from Oxford
English food writers
Women food writers
English women journalists
20th-century British journalists
20th-century British women writers
21st-century British journalists
21st-century British women writers
Runciman family
20th-century English women
20th-century English people
21st-century English women
21st-century English people